Agafonovskaya is a rural locality (a village) in Oshevenskoye Rural Settlement of Kargopolsky District, Arkhangelsk Oblast, Russia. The population was 7 as of 2010.

Geography 
Agafonovskaya is located 26 km northwest of Kargopol (the district's administrative centre) by road. Vorobyovskaya is the nearest rural locality.

References 

Rural localities in Kargopolsky District